Dune: The Sisterhood is an upcoming science fiction streaming television series set in the Dune universe created by Frank Herbert, for HBO Max. Taking place approximately 10,000 years before the events of Herbert's 1965 novel Dune, it will focus on the origins of the Bene Gesserit, an exclusive sisterhood and political force whose members undergo physical training and mental conditioning to obtain superhuman powers and abilities. The series is positioned as a prequel to the 2021 Denis Villeneuve film Dune, and Alison Schapker serves as showrunner, writer, and executive producer.

Premise
Set 10,000 years before the ascension of Paul Atreides, the hero of the 1965 novel Dune, the series will follow two Harkonnen sisters as they combat forces that threaten the future of humankind, and establish the fabled sect known as the Bene Gesserit.

Cast

Main
 Emily Watson as Valya Harkonnen
 Indira Varma as Empress Natalya
 Sarah-Sofie Boussnina as Princess Ynez
 Shalom Brune-Franklin as Mikaela
 Faoileann Cunningham as Sister Jen
 Aoife Hinds as Sister Emeline
 Chloe Lea as Lila
 Travis Fimmel as Desmond Hart
 Mark Strong as Emperor Javicco Corrino
 Jade Anouka as Sister Theodosia
 Chris Mason as Keiran Atreides

Recurring
 Josh Heuston as Constantine Corrino
 Edward Davis as Harrow Harkonnen

Production

Development 
A full series order of Dune: The Sisterhood was announced on June 10, 2019, produced by Legendary Television for WarnerMedia's streaming service, HBO Max. The series would focus on the Bene Gesserit, and serve as a prequel to the 2021 film Dune. Denis Villeneuve would direct and produce the series' pilot with Jon Spaihts writing the screenplay, and both serve as executive producers alongside Byron Merritt, Kim Herbert, Kevin J. Anderson, and Brian Herbert, the son of Frank Herbert. Villeneuve said, "The Bene Gesserit have always been fascinating to me. Focusing a series around that powerful order of women seemed not only relevant and inspiring but a dynamic setting for the television series."

Shortly after its announcement, the project received criticism for its lack of female creatives except for Frank Herbert's granddaughter, Kim Herbert. Dana Calvo was hired in July 2019 to serve as showrunner alongside Spaihts. In November 2019, Spaihts left the series to focus on the film's sequel. The Hollywood Reporter reported that Legendary Television was "not happy" with Spaihts's early work as showrunner and opted to remove him. Diane Ademu-John had been hired as the new showrunner by July 2021. As production of Dune: Part Two progressed, Villeneuve was no longer able to direct, and Johan Renck replaced him as director for the first two episodes in April 2022. In October, Emily Watson, Shirley Henderson, Indira Varma, Sarah-Sofie Boussnina, Shalom Brune-Franklin, Faoileann Cunningham, Aoife Hinds, and Chloe Lea were cast to star in the series. Travis Fimmel joined the following month. Shortly after the start of production on the series began, it was announced that Diane Ademu-John stepped down as co-showrunner but staying on creatively as executive producer, thus leaving Alison Schapker as sole showrunner. On December 1, 2022, Mark Strong, Jade Anouka, and Chris Mason joined cast in starring roles. Music composer Jónsi was hired to do the show's score. Josh Heuston and Edward Davis would join in recurring roles later that month.

Filming
The series began production on November 22, 2022, with Renck confirming this on his Instagram. It was originally set to commence filming on November 2, 2020, in Budapest and Jordan.

In February 2023, it was announced that production was put on hiatus as Renck exited the project, in addition to Henderson exiting her role.

References

External links
 

American prequel television series
English-language television shows
HBO Max original programming
Television shows based on Dune (franchise)
Television shows directed by Johan Renck
Upcoming television series
Works by Brian Herbert
Works by Kevin J. Anderson